Héricourt-sur-Thérain (literally Héricourt on Thérain) is a commune in the Oise department in northern France.

See also
 Communes of the Oise department

References

External links

 Héricourt sur Thérain, the official website ( in French and in English)

Communes of Oise